Temptress Moon is a 1996 Chinese film directed by Chen Kaige. It was jointly produced by the Shanghai Film Studio and the Taipei-based Tomson Films. The film saw Chen reuniting with Leslie Cheung and Gong Li who had previously worked with him in his breakout international hit Farewell My Concubine.

Ye Zhaoyan's novel A Flower's Shade was believed to be the basis for the film, although Ye was not credited in the film.

Temptress Moon premiered at the 1996 Cannes Film Festival, where it was in competition for the Palme d'Or that eventually went to Mike Leigh's Secrets & Lies. Despite its international profile, the film was banned by state authorities in Mainland China.

Synopsis

Childhood at the Pang estate
The film opens on February 12, 1912 (still 1911 Xin Hai Year in the Chinese calendar), the day of the abdication of Emperor Pu Yi, the end of the Qing Dynasty. The Pang clan, a wealthy family in a small town near Shanghai is suffering a similarly drawn out decline. Yu Zhongliang (Leslie Cheung), then a 13-year-old boy, arrives at the Pang estate to live with his sister Yu Xiuyi (He Saifei) and her husband Pang Zhengda (Zhou Yemang), both heavy opium users. Zhengda sexually abuses Zhongliang, forcing him into incest with his own sister and generally treating him like a servant. Pang Ruyi (Gong Li), daughter of the head of the family, has been raised as an opium addict from birth and is consequently unable to be married off. Duanwu (Kevin Lin), a distant cousin with no prospects, longs to play with Ruyi. All three momentarily share a doorway.

After a period of months of continued abuse, Zhongliang flees the estate, heavily implied to have poisoned his brother-in-law in revenge. As Zhongliang attempts to find his way to Beijing, however, he is robbed by a group of children and subsequently taken by several men to Shanghai where he is embraced by the triads.

Zhongliang's return
Ten years later, Zhongliang has become a handsome gigolo who seduces rich, married women for his triad Boss in order to blackmail them. The triad's modus operandi usually involves Zhongliang paying a visit to the woman in her room (a secret rendezvous) whereupon he would usually send a clear signal to his cohorts by opening the curtains of the room's window. His partners in crime would then storm the room and stage a semi-mock stickup, capturing the illicit couple unawares by pulling a black bag over their heads. The victim would then be threatened with exposure of the licentious affair or alternatively pay a hefty sum to keep the matter under wraps, with the victim being made to believe that Zhongliang has been swiftly 'murdered' by the thugs. In this aspect, Zhongliang succeeded beyond his triad's wildest dreams, and his boss, Biggie (Xie Tian) dotes on him like his own son. Nevertheless, Biggie forces Zhongliang to return to the Pang estate against his will.

Meanwhile, Ruyi's rise to power in the Pang family is not without controversy. Because her brother has been rendered unable to move or speak by Zhongliang's poison, she is the only competent child of her father. As a result, she is the natural heir to the family. The family elders, still traditional in their outlook, refuse to let a woman control the fate of the family. As a result, they bring Duanwu, whom they hope can be their "tool" to control Ruyi.

Duanwu, however, has been entranced by Ruyi since childhood and allows her more-or-less free rein. Ruyi uses her power to expel her father's concubines, infuriating the elders who beat Duanwu for his apparent impotence. For the concubines' part, many are distraught (with some attempting suicide), but they all eventually leave with their stipends. Ruyi questions her own actions but reasons that the concubines have been given the freedom that she longs for and will never have.

It is into this intra-family drama that Zhongliang inserts himself, sympathizing with Ruyi's entrapment. By orders of his boss, Zhongliang is to seduce Ruyi, the new head of the household, and afterwards blackmail her. Ruyi, having fallen in love with Zhongliang, seduces Duanwu in order to "practice" for Zhongliang. Zhongliang, haunted by his past and unable to go through with ruining both Ruyi and Duanwu, abandons the scheme at the last moment and returns to Shanghai alone. Ruyi is heartbroken, unable to speak of anything else, and Duanwu is beaten by the elders yet again.

Shanghai
To atone for his failure, Zhongliang agrees to swindle the Woman of Zephyr Lane (Zhou Jie), to whom he had developed an emotional attachment prior to his return to the Pang estate. Biggie, sensing Zhongliang is wavering in his duties despite this show of loyalty, tricks Ruyi into coming to Shanghai. Ruyi is accompanied by Duanwu who, with his traditional clothing, hairstyle, mannerisms and sheltered life, finds himself out of place in the modern city. The triad reveals Zhongliang's complicity to the Woman of Zephyr Lane while Ruyi looks on. The Woman of Zephyr Lane demands to know if Zhongliang ever loved her, a question Zhongliang can't answer due to the abuse suffered in his childhood. The Woman of Zephyr Lane throws herself off the balcony and as the others flee, Ruyi tends to her corpse. Biggie bemoans the permanent loss of Zhongliang as a tool. Dressed in contemporary Shanghai clothing, Ruyi confronts Zhongliang, and repeatedly asks if Zhongliang loved her or The Woman of Zephyr Lane. Zhongliang is still unable to answer. Duanwu, cracking under the pressure of the masculine role beaten into him, rapes Ruyi.

A reversal of roles
Ruyi thereupon returns to the Pang estate, but things have changed. First, Ruyi learns that her childhood betrothal, Jingyun (David Wu) has returned. Jingyun informs Ruyi that their initial betrothal had been ended by his family due to Ruyi's opium addiction, but that he had returned on his own. Zhongliang, too, returns upon learning of Jingyun's return desperately tries to win Ruyi back. Blinded by jealousy and anger, Zhongliang poisons Ruyi (in the same manner that he had poisoned his abusive brother-in-law, it is here confirmed). Shortly afterwards, he is gunned down on the dock by the triad. Duanwu, who is no longer the passive cousin he was earlier in the film is proclaimed as the new head of the Pang clan in an elaborate ancestral ceremony. Ruyi, meanwhile, is shown tied to a chair, destroyed as a result of smoking arsenic laced opium. In the final scene, we see Zhongliang, Duanwu and Ruyi as children; standing in the doorway on the night of the Emperor's abdication.

Cast
 Gong Li as Pang Ruyi, the only daughter and ruler of the Pang clan. 
 Kevin Lin as Pang Duanwu, a distant cousin to Pang Ruyi.
 Leslie Cheung as Yu Zhongliang, the brother-in-law to Ruyi.
 He Saifei as Yu Xiuyi, Zhongliang's sister.
 Zhou Ye Mang as Pang Zhengda, Ruyi's brother and husband to Yu Xiuyi;
 Patrick Tse as Biggie, a Triad boss who employs Zhongliang as a gigolo in his extortion schemes
 Zhou Jie as Woman on Zephyr Lane, Zhongliang develops a personal attachment to this woman who the Boss wishes to blackmail.
 David Wu as Jingyun, Ruyi's betrothed as a child.
 Zhou Xun a nightclub girl
 Chang Shih Li Niangjiu
 Lin Lian Kun as Pang An
 Ko Hsiang-ting as Elder Qi
 Ren Lei as the young Yu Zhongliang
 Ying Wang as the young Pang Ruyi
 Lin Ge as the young Pang Duanwu

Production
Despite its smaller scale story, Temptress Moon proved far more difficult a production than its predecessor, Chen's Farewell My Concubine. Although filming began in 1994, Moon did not wrap until more than a year later in 1995; the film's budget in the intervening time having ballooned to over $7 million (US), over twice as much as Concubine. Other problems arose as well, notably the firing of the original Ruyi, the Taiwanese actress Wang Ching-ying, about halfway through the shoot. The resulting delay lasted five months before filming resumed with Gong Li in the lead role.

Reception
Unlike the near universal praise for Concubine, Temptress Moon'''s reception abroad was considerably more muted. Critics praised the sumptuous visuals by Australian cinematographer Christopher Doyle, but also cited the confusing plot. Roger Ebert, in a typical review, noted "Temptress Moon is a hard movie to follow--so hard, that at some point you may be tempted to abandon the effort and simply enjoy the elegant visuals..." The New York Times also praised the film's sumptuous production values, but critic Stephen Holden also found the film to lack emotional weight, arguing that Temptress Moon ultimately "has the feel of a chic, kink-ornamented romantic pageant, unfolding at a distance."Temptress Moon holds a 62% rating on Rotten Tomatoes based on reviews from 13 critics.

 Awards and nominations 
 1996 Cannes Film Festival - Official selection
 Hong Kong Film Awards, 1997
 Best Actress — Gong Li (nominated)
 Best Cinematography — Christopher Doyle (nominated)
 Best Art Direction — Wong Hap-Kwai (nominated)
 Golden Horse Awards, 1996
 Best Actor — Leslie Cheung (nominated)

Home media releaseTemptress Moon'' was released on Region 1 DVD in the United States and Canada on July 2, 2002 by Miramax Films through Buena Vista Home Video label. The DVD featured subtitles in English.

References

External links
 
 
 
 Temptress Moon at the Chinese Movie Database

1996 films
Chinese romantic drama films
1990s Mandarin-language films
Films set in Shanghai
Films set in the 20th century
Films set in 1912
1996 romantic drama films
Films directed by Chen Kaige
Shanghai Film Studio films
Films about opium
Triad films
Films with screenplays by Wang Anyi
1990s Hong Kong films